Elizabeth Plank (born March 19, 1987) is a Canadian author and journalist. She was a senior producer and political correspondent at Vox, and began hosting her journalism show called Positive Spin at NBC News in July 2020. She is a columnist for MSNBC.

Early life
Plank grew up in Montreal. She worked as a community counselor for people with developmental disabilities while attending McGill University, majoring in women's studies and international development. She received the Sheila Finestone Award, a prize given to an outstanding undergraduate student studying in the field of Women's Studies.

She received a master's degree at the London School of Economics, and began writing articles about gender and human rights for the Huffington Post. While working as a research assistant for Behavioral economics professor Paul Dolan, she launched a Change.org petition that collected more than 55,000 signatures, and succeeded in reversing a decision by the Amateur International Boxing Association requiring female boxers to wear skirts while competing at the 2012 London Olympic Games.

Career
In 2013, Plank began her media career as an intern at the New York City-based Mic. She served as a correspondent and co-creator of the weekly video series "Flip the Script", which covered issues like feminism, homophobia and racism. Plank also served as a correspondent for the MSNBC live web show Krystal Clear.

Plank was recruited to cover the 2016 election for Vox Media, where she wrote, hosted, produced and starred in several critically acclaimed series about politics. She used her platform to elevate issues of gender equality, disability rights, transphobia and racial justice while interviewing political figures such as Prime Minister Justin Trudeau, Senator Cory Booker, Stacey Abrams and presidential candidate, Andrew Yang. In 2016, she produced and hosted 2016ish, an award-winning series about the presidential election, and gave a TedxTalk that inspired her first book, For the Love of Men: A New Vision for Mindful Masculinity, published in October 2019. Plank appears on cable news offering political analysis.

Plank is recognized in gender policy and was ranked as one of Forbes 30 Under 30 in the Media category. Marie Claire ranked her among Mediaite's Most Influential in News Media and one of the 50 most influential women.

She sits on the board of Girl Up, a United Nations Foundation non-profit organization that unites girls to change the world and has spoken alongside Meghan Markle, Michelle Obama, and Priyanka Chopra at their annual summits.

Plank co-hosts the Man Enough podcast with Justin Baldoni and Jamey Heath where they interview influential figures about their journey to manhood.

Books
For the Love of Men: From Toxic to a More Mindful Masculinity  was published by St. Martin's Press in 2019.

References

External links
 
 
 

1987 births
Living people
Canadian women journalists
Journalists from New York City
Vox (website) people
Canadian women non-fiction writers